Jane Rhiannon Aaron (born 1951) is a Welsh educator, literary researcher and writer. She was Professor of English at the University of Glamorgan in south Wales, until her retirement in September 2011. She then became an associate member of the Centre for the Study of Media and Culture in Small Nations at the University of South Wales. Aaron is known for her research and publications on Welsh literature and the writings of Welsh women.

Biography and research
Aaron was born on 26 September 1951 in Aberystwyth. Her father was the philosopher Richard Ithamar Aaron and his wife Annie Rhiannon Morgan. She graduated in English at the University of Wales, Swansea (1970–1973) and then studied at Somerville College, Oxford, where she gained a PhD in 1980.

In 1993, she was appointed Senior Lecturer of English at the University of Wales, Aberystwyth. She became Professor of English at the University of Glamorgan, Pontypridd, in 1999, remaining there until her retirement in 2011.

Since the early 1990s, Aaron has published a number of essays and books, and edited works for Honno Press, which specializes in the writings of Welsh women. In 1999 she edited Honno's anthology of short stories entitled, A View Across the Valley: Short Stories from Women in Wales 1850–1950.

In 1998, Aaron herself produced Pur Fel y Dur: Y Gymraes yn Llen Menywod y Bedwaredd Ganrif ar Bymtheg, an account in Welsh of the contribution by women to 19th-century Welsh literature. For this she received the Ellis Griffith Memorial Prize in 1999. She also wrote Nineteenth-Century Women's Writing in Wales: Nation, Gender and Identity (2007), for which she was awarded the Roland Mathias Prize in 2009.

Selected works

References

1951 births
Living people
Alumni of Somerville College, Oxford
Academics of the University of Glamorgan
People associated with the University of South Wales
Alumni of Swansea University
People from Aberystwyth
20th-century Welsh educators
21st-century Welsh educators
Welsh women educators
20th-century Welsh women writers
21st-century Welsh women writers
21st-century Welsh writers
20th-century women educators
21st-century women educators